Inside Detroit is a 1956 American film noir crime film directed by Fred F. Sears and starring Dennis O'Keefe and Pat O'Brien.

Inside Detroit is centered on corruption within the United Auto Workers union and is loosely adapted from the true tale of the Reuther brothers. The film's sets were designed by the art director Paul Palmentola.

Plot
Blair Vickers (O'Keefe) is head of the UAW union whose brother is killed during the bombing of the union headquarters. Gus Linden (O'Brien), a gangster determined to gain control of the UAW, is the man behind the bombing.

Cast
 Dennis O'Keefe as Blair Vickers
 Pat O'Brien as Gus Linden
 Tina Carver as Joni Calvin
 Margaret Field as Barbara Linden
 Mark Damon as Gregg Linden
 Larry J. Blake as Max Harkness
 Ken Christy as Ben Macauley
 Joe Turkel as Pete Link
 Paul Bryar as Sam Foran
 Robert E. Griffin as Hoagy Mitchell
 Guy Kingsford as Jenkins
 Dick Rich as Toby Gordon
 Norman Leavitt as Preacher Bronislav
 Katherine Warren as Ethel Linden

External links 
 
 
 
 

1956 films
Film noir
1956 crime films
American crime films
Columbia Pictures films
Films directed by Fred F. Sears
Films set in the 1950s
Films set in Detroit
Films about the labor movement
1950s English-language films
1950s American films
American black-and-white films